Senator McCreesh may refer to:

John McCreesh (1881–1959), Pennsylvania State Senate
Thomas McCreesh (1928–2016), Pennsylvania State Senate